Eischen is a surname. Notable people with the surname include:

 Albert Eischen (1899–1949), Luxembourgian racing cyclist
 Clem Eischen (1926–2020), American middle-distance runner
 Joey Eischen (born 1970), American baseball player

See also
 Eischen Bar, bar and restaurant in Oklahoma City